The Social Movement "Donetsk Republic" (ODDR) is a pro-Russian separatist political movement operating in the Donetsk region of Ukraine. Before its annexation, the movement's goal was the creation of a "federation of sovereign Donetsk", which would include seven regions of eastern and southern Ukraine. The group was banned in 2007, but this ban was marginal until the 2014 Donbas war. In 2014, it founded the Donetsk People's Republic, which Ukraine's government deems a terrorist organization. The movement won the 2014 Donbas general elections with 68.53% of the vote and 68 seats, which were condemned as illegitimate and a violation of the Minsk ceasefire agreements between Ukraine, Russia, and the OSCE.

History

Before the Russo-Ukrainian War

The organization was established on 6 December 2005 as a city organization by Andrei Purguin, Alexander Tsurkan, and Oleh Frolov and on 9 December 2005 with support of Hennadiy Prytkov as a regional organization. The main goal of the organization was to grant the eastern regions of Ukraine a special status. It claimed to fight the "orange plague" of President Viktor Yushchenko. Their goal was to create a Federal Republic of Donetsk in Southeast Ukraine. According to a map they published in 2006, this Federal Republic of Donetsk would comprise the Ukrainian Oblasts Kharkiv Oblast, Luhansk Oblast, Donetsk Oblast, Dnipropetrovsk Oblast, Zaporizhia Oblast and Kherson Oblast. 

Prior to the spring of 2014, the organization drew little support and remained on the margins of local politics.  Its pre-2014 rallies were averagely attended by about 30–50 people. From 17 to 22 November 2006, its activists were conducting protests in Donetsk and were gathering signatures on creation of the Donetsk Republic. Their activities were not supported by the prime minister, Viktor Yanukovych. At the beginning of 2007, representatives of the organization conducted number of activities in various cities of eastern Ukraine propagating the idea of separatism and federalization of the country.

Russo-Ukrainian War
In 2014, the organization founded the Donetsk People's Republic, which Ukraine's government deems a terrorist organization.

The group's leader, Andrei Purgin, was arrested by the Security Service of Ukraine during the 2014 pro-Russian unrest.

Th movement won the 2014 Donbas general elections with 68.53% of the vote and 68 seats. The Communist Party of the Donetsk People's Republic participates in the Donetsk Republic's parliamentary group. In the election campaign prior to these elections only the candidate of Donetsk Republic, Alexander Zakharchenko, used billboards. This resulted to the only visible campaign advertising in Donetsk being in support of Zakharchenko.

In the days and weeks prior until the postponement of the DNR October 2015 local elections (to 21 February 2016) 90% of the (campaign) advertising was done by Donetsk Republic.

Electoral results

Head

People's Council

References

External links

Truth about the Donetsk separatists. New Region. 14 September 2006.

2005 establishments in Ukraine
2014 pro-Russian unrest in Ukraine
Banned political parties in Ukraine
Banned secessionist parties
Federalist parties
Organizations based in Donetsk
Political parties established in 2005
Political parties in the Donetsk People's Republic
Russian nationalism in Ukraine
Russian political parties in Ukraine
Secessionist organizations in Europe
Separatism in Ukraine
Organizations designated as terrorist by Ukraine
Anti-Americanism
Anti-Maidan
Social conservative parties
Anti-Ukrainian sentiment in Ukraine